KBCS-FM (91.3 MHz) is a public FM radio station licensed to Bellevue, Washington, and serving the Puget Sound region, including Seattle.  It is owned by Bellevue College and broadcasts in HD Radio  The station has an effective radiated power (ERP) of 1,800 watts, broadcasting from a tower 1276 feet in height above average terrain (HAAT) on Cougar Mountain.

KBCS studios are located on the Bellevue College campus in the city of Bellevue. The station can be heard between Tacoma to the south and Marysville in Snohomish County to the north.  But closer to the Canadian border, the station is difficult to pick up because of co-channel interference from CJZN in Victoria, British Columbia.

A wide variety of music is heard on KBCS-FM, including Electronic Dance Music (EDM), Funk, Latin Music, Brazilian, Underground Hip Hop, Folk, Blues, Gospel Music, Music of Asia, African Music, Reggae, Classical Music, World Music, Jazz and Americana.  The station also airs local and world news and information, including nationally syndicated programs Democracy Now! and The Thom Hartmann Show, both heard weekday mornings.

KBCS is managed by a small staff, along with over 150 volunteer hosts, producers, journalists and administrators. The station offers training in journalism and broadcast production to the public. KBCS has launched the careers of a number of noted regional and national public radio professionals.

History
A student sit-in protest led to the creation of the station. KBCS-FM went on the air on Monday, February 5, 1973, originally with 10 watts of power.  It used equipment donated by Dorothy Stimson Bullitt of KING-FM.  Its limited coverage meant the station could only be heard on campus and in the surrounding neighborhoods.  By the late 1970s, the power was boosted to 100 watts.  In the 1990s, the power was again increased, this time to 7,900 watts, allowing KBCS to be heard around the Seattle metropolitan area.

It remained student-run until 1988 when Bellevue College administrators hired a general manager for the station and adopted a community radio model.  In the 1990s, the power was again increased, this time to 7,900 watts, allowing KBCS to be heard around the Seattle metropolitan area.  Over time, the station became self-sustaining, funded primarily by listener donations and on-air pledge drives.

See also
Community radio
List of community radio stations in the United States

References

Further reading

External links
Community Radio - KBCS

BCS
Community radio stations in the United States
Radio stations established in 1973
1973 establishments in Washington (state)